Bulgarian Crisis may refer to:
Bulgarian Crisis (1885–88)
Bulgarian Declaration of Independence (1908)
Negotiations of Bulgaria with the Central Powers and the Entente (1915)
Incident at Petrich (1925)
Bulgarian financial crisis of 1996–97
2013 Bulgarian protests